Edwin Fitzgerald Jr. (February 4, 1905 – July 15, 1983), known professionally as Eddie Foy Jr., was an American stage, film, and television actor.

Early life

Edwin Fitzgerald Jr. was born on February 4, 1905, in New Rochelle, New York, the son of vaudevillian Eddie Foy and his third wife, Madeline Morando. He was one of the "Seven Little Foys" immortalized in the 1955 film of the same name. Of the seven, he had the longest performing career, and the only one in movies (though six Foys appeared in two short films directed by his elder brother Bryan Foy).

Career
He made his Broadway debut in Florenz Ziegfeld's 1929 extravaganza Show Girl alongside Ruby Keeler and Jimmy Durante. He also appeared in At Home Abroad, The Cat and the Fiddle, The Red Mill, The Pajama Game, Donnybrook!, and Rumple (1957), for which he received a Tony Award nomination as Best Actor in a Musical.

Throughout the 1930s and 1940s, Foy appeared in dozens of B movies. He closely resembled his father, and portrayed him in four feature films: Frontier Marshal (1939), Lillian Russell (1940), Yankee Doodle Dandy (1942), and Wilson (1944), and again in a 1964 telefilm about the family's early days in vaudeville. Additional film credits include The Farmer Takes a Wife, The Pajama Game, Bells Are Ringing, and Gidget Goes Hawaiian.

Foy found steady work with the advent of television. In addition to a leading role in the first hour-long sitcom, Fair Exchange, he made numerous guest appearances on such programs as The Gisele MacKenzie Show, Alfred Hitchcock Presents, Glynis, My Living Doll, Burke's Law, ABC Stage 67, My Three Sons, and Nanny and the Professor.

Personal life
In 1933, Foy married Anna Marie McKenney. They had a son, Eddie Foy III, and she died in 1952.

Death
Foy died of pancreatic cancer in Los Angeles on July 15, 1983 at age 78. He is buried alongside his father and siblings (except his brother Bryan) in Holy Sepulchre Cemetery in New Rochelle, New York.

Filmography

 The Swell Head (1928)
 Queen of the Night Clubs (1929) – Eddie Parr
 Leathernecking (1930) – Chick Evans
 Nearly Naked (1933) – Eddie
 Broadway Thru a Keyhole (1933) – Joan's partner
 Myrt and Marge (1933) – Eddie Hanley
 Moulin Rouge (1934) – Magician (uncredited)
 Wonder Bar (1934) – Chorus Boy / Angel Measuring Wings (uncredited)
 King of Burlesque (1936) – Dancer (uncredited)
 Star for a Night (1936) – Dancer (uncredited)
 College Holiday (1936) – Dancer (uncredited)
 Turn Off the Moon (1937) – Dancer
 Secret Service of the Air (1939) – Gabby Watters (#1 'Secret Service series')
 Women in the Wind (1939) – Denny Corson
 Code of the Secret Service (1939) – Gabby (#2 'Secret Service series')
 Frontier Marshal (1939) – Eddie Foy
 The Cowboy Quarterback (1939) – Steve Adams
 Smashing the Money Ring (1939) – Gabby (#3 'Secret Service series')
 Lillian Russell (1940) – Eddie Foy Sr.
 Murder in the Air (1940) – Gabby Watters (#4 'Secret Service series', final)
 A Fugitive from Justice (1940) – Ziggy
 Scatterbrain (1940) – Eddie MacIntyre
 The Texas Rangers Ride Again (1941) – Mandolin
 The Case of the Black Parrot (1941) – Tripod Daniels
 Rookies on Parade (1941) – Cliff Dugan
 Country Fair (1941) – Johnny Campbell
 Puddin' Head (1941) – Harold L. Montgomery Jr.
 Four Jacks and a Jill (1942) – Happy McScud
 Yokel Boy (1942) – Joe Ruddy
 Yankee Doodle Dandy (1942) – Eddie Foy
 Powder Town (1942) – Mr. Billy Meeker
 Moonlight Masquerade (1942) – Lord Percy Ticklederry
 Joan of Ozark (1942) – Eddie McCabe
 Dixie Dugan (1943) – Matt Hogan
 Dixie (1943) – Mr. Felham
 And the Angels Sing (1944) – Fuzzy Johnson
 Wilson (1944) – Eddie Foy
 Honeychile (1951) – Eddie Price
 The Farmer Takes a Wife (1953) – Fortune Friendly
 Lucky Me (1954) – Duke McGee
 The Pajama Game (1957) – Vernon Hines
 Bells Are Ringing (1960) – J. Otto Prantz
 Gidget Goes Hawaiian (1961) – Monty Stewart
 Gidget Goes to Rome (1963) – Beachgoer Wanting to Use Phone (uncredited)
 30 Is a Dangerous Age, Cynthia (1968) – Oscar
 Won Ton Ton, the Dog Who Saved Hollywood (1976) – Custard Pie Star

References

External links

 
 
 

American male stage actors
American male film actors
American male television actors
American male child actors
American male musical theatre actors
Vaudeville performers
1905 births
1983 deaths
American people of Irish descent
Male actors from New Rochelle, New York
20th-century American male actors
Deaths from pancreatic cancer
Deaths from cancer in California
Burials at Holy Sepulchre Cemetery (New Rochelle, New York)
20th-century American male singers
20th-century American singers